The Pairs Mixed event was held on July 24.

Results

References

Pairs Mixed
2009 in gymnastics